The flame-rumped tanager (Ramphocelus flammigerus) is a species of bird in the family Thraupidae. It is found in semi-open forest and woodland.

The most widespread subspecies, icteronotus, is found in the Tumbes-Chocó-Magdalena in Panama, Colombia, Ecuador and Peru, and is sometimes considered a separate species, the lemon-rumped tanager (R. icteronotus). However, it is known to hybridize with the nominate subspecies from the Cauca Valley in Colombia.

Males of both subspecies have a mainly black plumage and a narrowly black-tipped pale bluish bill. The rump of the male P. f. icteronotus is yellow, while it is red in P. f. flammigerus. In females, the head, wings and tail are blackish-brown and the underparts are mainly yellow. The rump is yellowish in the female P. f. icteronotus, while the rump, vent and chest are orange-red in P. f. flammigerus.

References

flame-rumped tanager
Birds of the Colombian Andes
Endemic birds of Colombia
flame-rumped tanager
Taxonomy articles created by Polbot